

France
 Grenada – Pierre-Claude Bonvoust d'Aulnay de Prulay, Governor of Grenada (1757–1762)
 Guadeloupe – Charles François Emmanuel Nadau du Treil, Governor of Guadeloupe (1757–1759)

Great Britain
Bermuda – William Popple, Governor of Bermuda (1755–1763)
Gibraltar – The Earl of Home, Governor of Gibraltar (1757–1761)

Netherlands
Aruba – Jan van der Biest, Commander of Aruba (1756–1768)
Dutch Ceylon – Jan Schreuder, Governor of Ceylon (1757–1762)
Dutch East Indies – Jacob Mossel, Governor-General of the Dutch East Indies (1750–1761)

Ottoman Empire
Egypt Eyalet – Moustafa Pasha, Wali of Egypt (1757–1760)

Portugal
 Angola – 
 António Álvares da Cunha, Governor of Angola (1753–1758)
 António de Vasconcelos, Governor of Angola (1758–1764)
 Macau –
 Francisco Antonio Pereira Coutinho, Governor of Macau (1755–1758)
 D. Diogo Pereira, Governor of Macau (1758–1761)

Spain
 New Spain – Agustín de Ahumada, Viceroy of New Spain (1755–1760)

Colonial governors
Colonial governors
1758